Vict. may refer to:

 Marie-Victorin Kirouac (1885–1944), Canadian botanist
 Queen Victoria (1819–1901), Queen of the United Kingdom
 Victoria (Australia)

See also
 Victor (disambiguation)
 Victoria (disambiguation)